The Northwestern Wildcats college football team represents the Northwestern University in the Big Ten Conference. The Wildcats compete as part of the NCAA Division I Football Bowl Subdivision. The program has had 29 head coaches since it began play during the 1876 season. Since July 2006, Pat Fitzgerald has served as head coach at Northwestern.

Four coaches have led Northwestern in postseason bowl games: Bob Voigts, Gary Barnett, Randy Walker, and Fitzgerald. Six of those coaches also won conference championships: Walter McCornack captured one as a member of the Western Conference; and Dick Hanley and Barnett each captured two and Pappy Waldorf, Glenn Thistlethwaite, and Walker each captured one as a member of the Big Ten Conference.

Fitzgerald is the leader in overall wins and seasons coached with 110 wins during his 17 years as head coach. Walter McCornack has the highest winning percentage at 0.800. Rick Venturi has the lowest winning percentage at 0.045. Of the 29 different head coaches who have led the Orange, Charlie Bachman, Waldorf, Alex Agase, and Ara Parseghian have been inducted into the College Football Hall of Fame.

Key

Coaches

Notes

References

Northwestern

Northwestern Wildcats bowl games